Diethylaniline is the organic compound with the molecular formula (C2H5)2NC6H5.  It is a colorless liquid but commercial samples are often yellow.  It is a precursor to several dyes and other commercial products.

Uses
Its condensation with half an equivalent of benzaldehyde gives brilliant green, an analogue of the very useful malachite green.  With formylbenzenedisulfonic acid it condenses to give Patent blue VE, and with hydroxybenzaldehyde followed by sulfonation one obtains Patent blue V. When treated with phosgene, one obtains Ethyl violet, an analogue of methyl violet.

In organic synthesis, the complex diethylaniline·borane (DEANB) is used as a reducing agent.

Diethylaniline and dimethylaniline are both used as acid-absorbing bases.

Safety
Diethylaniline may be genotoxic because it has been found to increase the rate of sister chromatid exchange.

See also
 Dimethylaniline

References

Anilines
Diethylamino compounds